Vasileiou or Vas[s]iliou is a Greek surname. Notable people with the surname include:

 Alexandros Vasileiou (1760–1818), Greek merchant and scholar
 Alexia Vassiliou (born 1964), Cypriot singer and musician
 Androulla Vasiliou (born 1943), Cypriot and European politician
 Eleni Vasileiou (born 1974), Greek basketball player
 George Vasiliou (born 1931),  third President of the Republic of Cyprus
 Giorgos Vasiliou (1950–2016), Greek actor
 Giorgos Vasiliou (born 1984), Cypriot footballer
 Mari Vasileiou (born 1990), Cypriot beauty pageant winner
 Maria Vassiliou (1950–1989), Cypriot actress
 Marius Vassiliou (born 1957), American geophysicist
 Markos Vassiliou (born 1983), Greek Musician 
 Michael Vasileiou, Greek merchant
 Nikos Vasiliou (born 1977), Greek footballer
 Panagiotis Vasiliou (born 1961), Greek squash champion
 Spyros Vassiliou (1902–1985), Greek painter
 Stylianos Vasileiou (born 1991), Greek footballer

Greek-language surnames
Patronymic surnames
Surnames from given names